Cobain is a 2018 Dutch drama film directed by Nanouk Leopold. In July 2018, it was one of nine films shortlisted to be the Dutch entry for the Best Foreign Language Film at the 91st Academy Awards, but it was not selected.

Cast
 Bas Keizer as Cobain
 Naomi Velissariou as Mia
 Wim Opbrouck as Wickmayer
 Dana Marineci as Adele
 Cosmina Stratan as Jadwiga

References

External links
 

2018 films
2018 drama films
Dutch drama films
2010s Dutch-language films